Gorodishchenskaya is a rural locality (a village) in Telegovskoye Rural Settlement of Krasnoborsky District, Arkhangelsk Oblast, Russia. The population was 119 as of 2010.

Geography 
Gorodishchenskaya is located 5 km southeast of Krasnoborsk (the district's administrative centre) by road. Yershevskaya is the nearest rural locality.

References 

Rural localities in Krasnoborsky District